Koba is a sub-district in the Indonesian province of Bangka-Belitung, Indonesia. Koba is located in the Central Bangka Regency on the islands of Bangka Belitong, Indonesia.

Demographics

The majority of the people in Koba are Hakka Chinese and Malay. Majority of Chinese are Buddhism, Catholic and Protestant.

Climate
Koba has a tropical rainforest climate (Af) with heavy rainfall year-round.

References

Populated places in the Bangka Belitung Islands
Regency seats of the Bangka Belitung Islands
Districts of the Bangka Belitung Islands